Perumaan ( Shiva) is a 2012 Tamil-language thriller film starring newcomers Arjun Das and Shruti in the lead roles while the producer Sriram Vedam plays a negative role.

Cast  
Arjun Das as Shakti
Shruti as Shakti's girlfriend
Sriram Vedam as Gangster
Ashwin
Madan
Jai
Krishna

Production 
The film began production as Perumaan The Rajnikanth. Initially, Rajinikanth approved the name of the film. However, the name was shortened to Perumaan upon release after Rajinikanth's spokesperson, V M Sudhakar, thought it was unacceptable for anybody to call him as higher than a deity.

Soundtrack
The songs were composed by Luiji and Vikram Sarathy R.
"Life Is Bimbilaaki Bilaapi" - Luiji, Rajesh Kanna
"Swapna Sundari" - Vikram Sarathy, Keerthana 
"Om Om Siva" -  Vikram Sarathy, Sricharan 
"Hey Snehidhiye" - Nikhil Mathew
"Vaanum Manum" -  Vikram Sarathy 
"My Sarah" - Luiji and Smruthi

Release
The Times of India gave the film three out of five stars stating that "It is this tough story that Rajesh Kannan sets out to tackle, and to his credit, it must be said that he has done a decent job". News 18 Praised the story, but criticized the slow screenplay. The reviewer wrote that "Agreed that Rajesh Kannan has presented an original story. But the pace in which the movie moves is too slow, something which he cannot afford in a suspense thriller". Behindwoods gave the film one half out of five stars stating that "To sum up, Perumaan could have been made as a decent short film. Fewer dialogues, jumpy song sequences and the dead slow script show the director’s desperation to make it into a two and a half hours feature film".

References

2012 films
2010s Tamil-language films